The 1912 U.S. National Championships (now known as the US Open) took place on the outdoor grass courts at the Newport Casino in Newport, United States. The men's singles tournament ran from 19 August until 26 August while the women's singles and doubles championship took place from 10 June to 15 June at the Philadelphia Cricket Club in Chestnut Hill. It was the 32nd staging of the U.S. National Championships, and the second Grand Slam tennis event of the year. The challenge round was abolished in this edition, thus requiring all participants, including the defending champion, to play the main draw.

Finals

Men's singles

 Maurice McLoughlin defeated  Wallace F. Johnson  3–6, 2–6, 6–2, 6–4, 6–2

Women's singles

 Mary Browne defeated  Eleonora Sears  6–4, 6–2

Men's doubles
 Maurice McLoughlin /  Tom Bundy defeated  Raymond Little /  Gustave F. Touchard 3–6, 6–2, 6–1, 7–5

Women's doubles
 Mary Browne /  Dorothy Greene defeated  Maud Barger-Wallach /  Mrs. Frederick Schmitz 6–2, 5–7, 6–0

Mixed doubles
 Mary Browne /  R. Norris Williams defeated  Eleonora Sears /  William Clothier 6–4, 2–6, 11–9

References

External links
Official US Open website

 
U.S. National Championships
U.S. National Championships (tennis) by year
U.S. National Championships (tennis)
U.S. National Championships (tennis)
U.S. National Championships
U.S. National Championships (tennis)
U.S. National Championships (tennis)